Doctor Who: Destiny of the Doctor is a series of audiobooks produced by Big Finish Productions for AudioGo. They were released monthly through the first eleven months of 2013 to celebrate the 50th anniversary of British television series Doctor Who. The series – composed of eleven separate releases, one for each incarnation of the Doctor – is performed in the third-person by an actor associated with each era of the show, with additional dialogue provided by a guest actor, in a similar vein to Big Finish's own The Companion Chronicles series. The series is notable for being the first time Big Finish was allowed to directly feature current era (2005 onwards) characters, due to the collaboration with AudioGo.

Release History
All instalments up to and including Death's Deal were initially released to download on the first day of each month, with a physical CD release on the following Thursday. However, due to series co-producer AudioGo entering administration at the end of October 2013, the release of the final instalment The Time Machine was disrupted. Some retailers (such as iTunes and Amazon.co.uk) released it on the scheduled date with minimal disruption, and others (such as Big Finish's official shop) released it later in the month. The appearance of a planned box set of all 11 releases (plus a bonus disc featuring interviews with cast and crew) was also cast into doubt, but released by Big Finish in December.

See also
List of Doctor Who audiobooks
List of Doctor Who audio plays by Big Finish

References

Audiobooks based on Doctor Who